Christmas with Conniff is a 1959 album from Ray Conniff of mostly secular holiday songs. The lone exception is the inclusion of "Greensleeves", also one of the few ballads on this album. For the most part, the album relies on uptempo songs like "Here Comes Santa Claus" and "Frosty the Snowman".

Track listing

References

1959 Christmas albums
Columbia Records Christmas albums
Ray Conniff albums
Christmas albums by American artists
Covers albums
Pop Christmas albums